Liam Dowling (25 January 1931 – 20 November 1996) was an Irish former hurler who played as a full-forward for the Cork senior team.

Dowling made his first appearance for the team during the 1952 championship and was a regular member of the starting fifteen at various intervals for much of the next decade. During that time he won two All-Ireland medals, two Munster medals and one National Hurling League medal.

At club level Dowling is a county senior championship medalist with Sarsfields. He also played with Castlemartyr.

Playing career

Club
Dowling began his club hurling career with his local Castlemartyr club.

In 1951 he won his first county junior championship with the club following a 6-5 to 2-7 defeat of Cloughduv.

Dowling won further divisional titles with the club before moving to the Sarsfields club in the mid-fifties. 'Sars' secured the county senior championship in 1957.

The 1960s saw Dowling switch his club allegiance back to Castlemartyr once again. He won a second county junior championship with the club in 1964, as Cloughduv were accounted for once again.

Inter-county
Dowling first came to prominence with the Cork senior hurlers in the early 1950s.  He won his first Munster title as a full-forward in 1952.  Dowling later collected his first All-Ireland medal following a victory over Dublin in the championship decider.  Cork continued their winning ways in 1953 with Dowling adding a National Hurling League medal to his collection.  He later collected his second Munster title before later winning a second All-Ireland medal, following Cork’s defeat of Galway in one of the dirtiest All-Ireland finals ever.

References

1931 births
1996 deaths
Castlemartyr hurlers
Sarsfields (Cork) hurlers
Cork inter-county hurlers
All-Ireland Senior Hurling Championship winners